The Horrible Histories troupe is an unofficial name given to a group of comedy writers and performers, consisting of Mathew Baynton, Simon Farnaby, Martha Howe-Douglas, Jim Howick, Laurence Rickard, and Ben Willbond. They are so called due to their initially collaborating for the children's TV show Horrible Histories, but have since worked together on the 2015 film Bill and the adult comedy series Yonderland and Ghosts.

Television
Horrible Histories (2009–13)Horrible Histories was a British sketch comedy and musical television series, based on the children's history books of the same name. The show was produced for CBBC by Lion Television with Citrus Television and ran from 2009 to 2013 for five series of thirteen half-hour episodes, with additional one-off seasonal and Olympic specials. The creative team was largely recruited from the UK comedy scene, including the central troupe alongside a large supporting cast headed by Katy Wix, Lawry Lewin, Alice Lowe and Dominique Moore. As well as carrying over the graphic style and much of the content of the Horrible Histories book series, the approach and humour of the show was inspired by past British historical comedies, including Blackadder and the Monty Python films.

Each episode covered multiple eras in history, named for their respective book titles. The show combined live-action sketches, which often parody other UK media or celebrities, with music videos, animations and quizzes. The series was a critical and ratings success, winning numerous domestic and international awards. In 2011 the show was the subject of a Live Prom at the Royal Albert Hall, where sketches and songs from the series were performed live. The cast left the series in 2014, after which the series was rebooted with a new creative team.

Yonderland (2013–16)

Following the end of Horrible Histories, the troupe reunited for Yonderland, a sitcom for children that was broadcast on Sky 1 from November 2013 to December 2016. Howe-Douglas starred as 33-year-old Debbie Maddox, who becomes increasingly bored with her life as a suburban stay-at-home mother until an elf (Baynton) appears from a portal in her cupboard, insisting that she's the "chosen one" destined to save the eponymous fantasy world. Reluctantly, Debbie agrees to meet with the Elders of the realm... only to discover that they've lost the scroll that explains what the chosen one is supposed to do. As it turns out, Yonderland is a silly, magical place, threatened by the evil Negatus (Farnaby). It will take all of Debbie's resources to complete each week's quest in time to pick up her children from school.

Ghosts (2019–present)

Ghosts is the troupe's most recent series, a sitcom which has broadcast on BBC One since 2019. It centres on a group of ghosts from different historical periods haunting a country house they share with its new living occupants (played by Kiell Smith-Bynoe and Charlotte Ritchie) . Along with the core members of the group, performers from the wider Horrible Histories cast appear in the ensemble, including Katy Wix.  The series is the first post-watershed comedy by the ensemble, although some television critics noted that the series was suitable for adults and children alike. Reviews of the series have been positive, with critics appreciating the high joke rate, the premise and the strength of the acting ensemble. The series was made by the production company Monumental Pictures, part of ITV Studios. It is filmed on location at West Horsley Place in Surrey. It has so far run for four series and 3 Christmas specials, and a fifth series has been announced. The show was remade for an American audience, starring Rose McIver and Utkarsh Ambudkar.

Films

Bill (2015)

The group's first film, Bill, was released on 18 September 2015. Whilst not officially related to the Horrible Histories series, it was produced by the BBC reunited and starred the original core performers of the series, and shared a humour approach to its historical content.

References 

British comedy troupes
British surrealist artists
Surreal comedy
British Academy Film Awards winners